Crenicichla scottii is a species of cichlid native to South America. It is found in the middle and lower parts of the Uruguay River drainage in Argentina, Uruguay and Brazil.

The fish is named in honor of vertebrate paleontologist William Berryman Scott (1858-1947) of Princeton University, who collected the type specimen.

References

Kullander, S.O., 2003. Cichlidae (Cichlids). p. 605-654. In R.E. Reis, S.O. Kullander and C.J. Ferraris, Jr. (eds.) Checklist of the Freshwater Fishes of South and Central America. Porto Alegre: EDIPUCRS, Brasil.

scottii
Fish of Argentina
Freshwater fish of Brazil
Fish of Uruguay
Taxa named by Carl H. Eigenmann
Fish described in 1907